Araba may refer to:

Places and jurisdictions 
 the Ancient Arab Kingdom of Hatra, a Roman-Parthian buffer state in modern Iraq
 Basque name of Álava, a province and medieval bishopric (now Latin titular see) in the autonomous Basque country, northern Spain 
 Arabah, a section of the Great Rift Valley
 Arraba, Israel, an Arab-Israeli town in Israel
 Arraba, Jenin, a Palestinian village in the West Bank

Other uses 
 Araba (album), a 1999 album by Mustafa Sandal
 Araba (carriage), a carriage (such as a cab or coach) used in Turkey and neighbouring countries; also spelled aroba
 Araba Formation, in palaeozoic geology
 Araba people, an indigenous Australian people of Queensland, Australia
 Araba language, an Australian language
 Araba (title), a chieftaincy title that may be held by a Yoruba priest of the oracle.

See also 
 Arava (disambiguation)
 Arraba (disambiguation)